Takeuchi ("within bamboo" or ; "warrior household") is a Japanese surname. It is common in west-central Japan, and is pronounced Takenouchi (Take-no-uchi) by some bearers. The family claims descent from the legendary hero-statesman Takenouchi-no-Sukune, himself supposedly a descendant of the mythical Emperor Kōgen and a counselor to several other emperors, including Emperor Ōjin (late 4th century). Other families such as the Soga clan also claim Takenouchi-no-Sukune as an ancestor. It can also be written as 竹野内.

The Takenouchi-ryū is a koryū tradition founded by Takenouchi Chūnagon Daijō Hisamori in 1532 and is still maintained today by his descendants.

People with the surname
, Japanese ice hockey player
, Japanese singer and member of girl group S/mileage
Akira Takeuchi (disambiguation), multiple people
, Japanese Butoh dancer
, Japanese rugby sevens player
Esther Sans Takeuchi, materials scientist
, Japanese mathematician
, Japanese speed skater
, Japanese racing driver
, Japanese professor and knowledge-management author
, Japanese voice actress
, Japanese water polo player
, Japanese contemporary composer
, Japanese singer and songwriter
, Japanese volleyball player
, Japanese actress
, Japanese singer and K-pop idol
, Japanese video game composer
, Japanese manga artist
, an actor in the Dead or Alive series of films
, Japanese baseball player
, Japanese historian
, Japanese physician
Shion Takeuchi (born 1988), American television writer and creator of the Netflix series Inside Job
, Japanese voice actor
, Japanese physicist
, Japanese shogi player
, Japanese Supreme Court justice
, Japanese television actress
, Japanese television actor
Takenouchi Tōjūrō Hisatake, 13th sōdenke of Takenouchi-ryū
Takenouchi Chūnagon Daijō Hisamori, founder of Takenouchi-ryū

Fictional characters
Sora Takenouchi, in the anime's Digimon Adventure and Digimon Adventure 02
Sora Takeuchi, in the manga and anime Air Gear
Momoko Takeuchi, in the manga Inubaka
Rio Takeuchi, a character in the anime Spiral
Takeuchi Tatsuru, (竹内多鹤) the heroine of the novel and TV drama Auntie Tatsuru (Chinese:小姨多鹤) by Chinese writer Yan Geling (Chinese:严歌苓)

See also
Crest of the Takeuchi family, a stylized ume blossom
Takeuchi Manufacturing, a Japanese heavy equipment manufacturer
Tak, mathematical recursive function named after Ikuo Takeuchi (竹内郁雄)
The Takeuchi Documents, texts in the Mahikari religious movement

Japanese-language surnames